Dohertya is a monotypic moth genus in the subfamily Arctiinae. Its single species, Dohertya cymatophoroides, is found in Myanmar. The genus and species were first described by George Hampson in 1894.

References

Lithosiini
Monotypic moth genera
Moths of Asia